Pusser is an American surname. Notable people with the surname include:

Buford Pusser (1937–1974), American sheriff

Surnames